Bom Sucesso (English: A Life Worth Living) is a Brazilian telenovela produced and broadcast by Globo. It premiered on 29 July 2019, replacing Verão 90, and ended on 24 January 2020, being replaced by Salve-se Quem Puder.

It stars Grazi Massafera, Rômulo Estrela, David Junior, Antônio Fagundes, Ingrid Guimarães, Fabiula Nascimento, Armando Babaioff and Sheron Menezzes in the main roles.

Plot 
Paloma (Grazi Massafera), is a seamstress who raised her three children alone: Alice (Bruna Inocencio), Gabriela (Giovanna Coimbra) and Peter (João Bravo). Paloma creates the costumes for Unidos de Bom Sucesso, a samba school. Her world turns upside down when she receives the wrong test results that confirm that she only has six months to live, which makes her do everything she never had the courage to do, including sleeping with a stranger, Marcos (Rômulo Estrela), who falls in love with her. Upon discovering that she received the wrong test results, Paloma decides to meet the man who does have six months to live and comes across Alberto (Antônio Fagundes), a millionaire who never valued his family. Despite opposite personalities, the two form a friendship that takes them on a journey of discovery: she through books and he through the pleasures of life and sleeping feelings, including reliving a love of the past with Vera (Ângela Vieira).

Cast

Main 
 Grazi Massafera as Paloma da Silva
 Rômulo Estrela as Marcos Prado Monteiro
 David Junior as Ramon Madeira
 Antônio Fagundes as Alberto Prado Monteiro
 Ingrid Guimarães as Silvana Nolasco
 Fabiula Nascimento as Mariana "Nana" Prado Monteiro
 Armando Babaioff as Diogo Cabral
 Sheron Menezzes as Gisele
 Lúcio Mauro Filho as Mário
 Jonas Bloch as Eric Feitosa
 Gabriel Contente as Vicente Machado
 Giovanna Coimbra as Gabriela da Silva
 Helena Fernandes as Eugênia Machado
 Eduardo Galvão as Dr. Roger Machado
 Mariana Molina as Evelyn
 Arthur Sales as Felipe
 Rafael Infante as Pablo Sanches
 Gabriela Moreyra as Francisca
 Antônio Carlos Bernardes as Leonel "Léo" Madeira
 Yasmin Gomlevsky as Thaíssa
 Felipe Haiut as Jefferson
 Bruna Inocencio as Alice da Silva
 Gabrielle Joie as Michelly
 Anderson Müller as Antônio Carlos da Silva
 Carla Cristina Cardoso as Lucimeire "Lulu" da Silva 
 Stella Freitas as Terezinha Vieira
 Romeu Evaristo as Fabrício Vieira
 Diego Montez as Willian
 Daniel Warren as Jorginho 
 Elam Lima as Zeca 
 Alexandra Martins as Leila
 Jorge Lucas as Dr. Mauri
 Guti Fraga as Father Paulo
 Lana Guelero as Glória Diniz
 Patrícia Costa as Esther
 Shirley Cruz as Gláucia
 Rafael Oliveira as Jeremias
 Caio Cabral as Patrick
 Igor Fernandez as Luan Diniz
 Lucas Leto as Waguinho
 Nathalia Altenbernd as Jeniffer
 Ícaro Amado as Pedro Santos
 Felipe Coutinho as José Bial
 Thaís Garayp as Bezinha
 Ju Colombo as Elomar
 Rosana Dias as Cláudia
 Marcelo Flores as Batista
 Alessandro Moussa as Marcondes
 João Bravo as Peter da Silva
 Valentina Vieira as Sofia Prado Monteiro

Guest stars 
 Isabella Scherer as Young Paloma
 David Reis as Young Ramon
 Rhaisa Batista as Marie
 Edmilson Barros as Dr. Cézar Castriotto
 Antônio Pedro as Agripino
 Bruna Aiiso as Toshi Noshimura
 Mariana Alves as Lorena
 Cristiano Felício as himself

Production 
The telenovela was approved with the title Chuvas de Verão, then in July 2018, it had its title changed to Bom Sucesso, as a reference to the neighborhood where the plot takes place. In February 2019, the title was once again changed this time to Doce Deleite, however the title was later reverted to Bom Sucesso. In March 2019, Globo took advantage of the samba school parades in Sambadrome Marquês de Sapucaí to film scenes for the telenovela. Filming officially began on 6 May 2019, and concluded in January 2020.

Soundtrack

Volume 1 

Bom Sucesso Vol. 1 is the first soundtrack of the telenovela, released on 18 October 2019 by Som Livre.

Volume 2 

Bom Sucesso Vol. 2 is the first soundtrack of the telenovela, released on 22 November 2019 by Som Livre.

Ratings 
Inheriting the high ratings of Verão 90, Bom Sucesso debuted at 31.5 points, making it the second largest audience of a first chapter since Cheias de Charme. The second chapter maintained the high ratings and recorded 32 points.

References

External links 
  
 

2019 telenovelas
TV Globo telenovelas
Brazilian telenovelas
2019 Brazilian television series debuts
2020 Brazilian television series endings
2010s Brazilian television series
2020s Brazilian television series
Brazilian LGBT-related television shows
Television shows set in Rio de Janeiro (city)
Portuguese-language telenovelas